Habenaria xanthantha, commonly known as the freak rein orchid, is a species of orchid that is endemic to far northern Queensland. It has two or three leaves at its base and up to twenty small white flowers often lacking the nectary spur present on other species in the genus.

Description 
The petals are a similar size to the lateral sepals. Flowering occurs from March to April.

Taxonomy and naming
Habenaria xanthantha was first formally described in 1869 by Ferdinand von Mueller and the description was published in Fragmenta Phytographiae Australiae. The specific epithet (xanthantha) is derived from the ancient Greek words  meaning "yellow" and  meaning "flower", although no yellow-flowering forms have been seen in the last fifty years.

Distribution and habitat
The freak rein orchid grows in moist to wet woodland on some Torres Strait Islands and on Cape York Peninsula south to Proserpine.

References

Orchids of Queensland
Endemic orchids of Australia
Plants described in 1869
xanthantha
Taxa named by Ferdinand von Mueller